The men's 500 metres in speed skating at the 1964 Winter Olympics took place on 4 February, at the Eisschnelllaufbahn Innsbruck.

Records
Prior to this competition, the existing world and Olympic records were as follows:

The following new Olympic record was set.

Results

References

Men's speed skating at the 1964 Winter Olympics